Sidney Domville (18 December 1886 – 23 December 1954) was a British gymnast. He competed at the 1908 Summer Olympics and the 1920 Summer Olympics.

References

1886 births
1954 deaths
British male artistic gymnasts
Olympic gymnasts of Great Britain
Gymnasts at the 1908 Summer Olympics
Gymnasts at the 1920 Summer Olympics
People from New Mills
Sportspeople from Derbyshire